Diabari is a place situated in Uttara, Dhaka. It is a tourist attraction in Uttara. Diabari consists of plain lands of Sectors 15 and 16 in Uttara. Trains of Dhaka Metro Rail starts journey from Diabari area. There is a canal which is 4.34 meters long. According to RAJUK's detailed area plan, there is a plan to build a road from Diabari to Gazipur.

Although a wide variety of birds are found here, the number of birds is declining due to man-made disasters. Due to the rural environment in the city, the value of this place has increased among the tourists. Tourists come here to see Kans grass. There are paddle boat arrangements for tourists. There is a children amusement park in the area named Fantasy Island.

References

Neighbourhoods in Dhaka
Uttara
Tourist attractions in Dhaka